Hey Na Na is the ninth studio album by Brazilian rock band Os Paralamas do Sucesso. It was released on June 16, 1998. Main hits of the album include "Ela Disse Adeus", "O Amor Não Sabe Esperar" and "Depois Da Queda O Coice".

Former Legião Urbana guitarist Dado Villa-Lobos made a special appearance, providing guitars for some tracks.

Track listing

Personnel
 Bi Ribeiro — bass
 Herbert Vianna — guitar, vocals
 João Barone — drums, percussion

References

1998 albums
Os Paralamas do Sucesso albums
EMI Records albums